Félix Faure is a station on line 8 of the Paris Métro in the 15th arrondissement.

The station was opened on 27 July 1937 as part of the extension of line 8 from La Motte-Picquet - Grenelle to Balard. The station is named after the Avenue Félix-Faure, which is named after Félix Faure, President from 1895 to 1899.

Station layout

Gallery

References
Roland, Gérard (2003). Stations de métro. D’Abbesses à Wagram. Éditions Bonneton.

Paris Métro stations in the 15th arrondissement of Paris
Railway stations in France opened in 1937